Egress may refer to:

 Data egress, data leaving a network in transit to an external location
 Egress, the right of a person to leave a property
 Egress (signal leakage), the passage of electromagnetic fields through the shield of a coaxial cable
 Egress Software Technologies, a provider of data security services
 Two of the four contacts observed during an astronomical transit

See also
 Egress filtering, in computer networking, monitoring and/or restricting the flow of outbound information
 Egressive sound, a type of sound in human speech
 Egressive case, a type of grammatical case
 Exit (disambiguation)
 Ingress (disambiguation)